Domaniç is a town and district of Kütahya Province in the Aegean region of Turkey. Ottoman Beylik was founded around Domaniç and Söğüt by Osman I, leader of the Kayi tribe. Domaniç is a Muslim town.

References

Populated places in Kütahya Province